Niagara Falls is a provincial electoral division in Ontario, Canada. It was created prior to the 1914 provincial election, and has existed continuously since then.

Its boundaries were significantly redrawn in 1999, when Ontario adjusted all of its provincial electoral divisions to match those at the federal level.

List of representatives

Election results

2007 electoral reform referendum

Sources

Elections Ontario Past Election Results
Map of riding for 2018 election

Fort Erie, Ontario
Niagara-on-the-Lake
Ontario provincial electoral districts
Politics of Niagara Falls, Ontario